The Championship of the Belarusian SSR in football – First League (Pershaja Liha chempijanatu BSSR pa futbole) was a top competition of association football in the Byelorussian Soviet Socialist Republic in 1922-91.

The first unofficial republican competition took place in 1922. Six years after (1928) as part of the Belarusian Spartakiade there took place the next unofficial football competitions of the republic. Since 1934 the competitions take place regularly on annual basis. Throughout its history there were 55 winners of the tournament. For some time there also existed second division of the competition.

In the system of leagues of the Soviet football, the Football Championship of the Belarusian SSR had a status as competitions of "collective of physical culture" (amateurs, the other status was "teams of masters").

Winners of the competition qualified for "super cup" format competition known as the Season's Cup and was played between a winner of the republican championship and a republican cup holder.

Unofficial competitions

Republican competitions among sports societies (First League)
The competitions were considered to be amateur. In Soviet Union officially all sports players were amateur athletes, however to differentiate level of teams, there were teams of sports societies and agencies (amateurs) and teams of masters (professionals).

At least since 1966 there were two all-republican divisions First League (Pershaja Liha) and Second League (Druhaja Liha).

In 1956, 1959 the competition was conducted among collective teams of regions (oblasts). In 1957, 1958 the competition was conducted among collective teams of cities.

‡ – winners of the Football Cup of the Belarusian SSR

Football Championship of the Belarusian SSR – Second League laureates 

Source

List of all champions

Performance by club

Qualification to All-Union competition
Before the World War II, the Byelorussian Soviet Socialist Republic was rarely represented at the Soviet competitions among teams of masters. There were Dinamo Minsk in 1937 (undetermined conditions), Spartak Minsk in 1939 (placed 3rd at republican competitions), and one more time Dinamo Minsk in 1940 (champion of the BSSR).

Following the war, Belarusian teams rejoined the all-Union competition in 1945 by the Belarusian Dinamo Minsk which continued to play among teams of masters until dissolution of the Soviet Union in 1991. In 1947 the competitions among teams of masters joined the 1946 Belarusian champion ODOKA Minsk that entered the 1947 Vtoraya Gruppa playing as DO Minsk (1947–1949).

In 1948 the all-Union competitions joined Spartak Minsk (1948–1949).

In 1950 took place reorganization of the Soviet football competitions and most Belarusian clubs were removed from competitions except for Dinamo.

In 1954 the all-Union competitions joined Pischevik Minsk (1954).

In 1957 the all-Union competitions joined Urozhai Minsk (1957–1960).

In 1960 the all-Union competitions joined Spartak (Lokomotiv) Gomel (1960–1991), Dvina (Krasnoje Znamja) Vitebsk (1960–1991), Spartak (Khimik) Mogilev (1960–1991), Dinamo (Spartak) Brest (1960–1991).

In 1961 the all-Union competitions joined Bobruisk (1961).

In 1962 the all-Union competitions joined SKA Minsk (1962–1963).

In 1964 the all-Union competitions joined Neman Grodno (1964–1991).

In 1963 Dvina, Spartak Mg, Spartak Br, SKA played in the Union republics Class B.

In 1964–1965 Dvina, Spartak Mg, Spartak Br, and Neman played in the Ukrainian Class B. In 1970 Spartak Br, Gomselmash and Neman played in Ukrainian competitions of Class A Second Group.

See also
 Belarusian Premier League
 Belarusian First League
 FC Dinamo Minsk

Notes

References

External links
 List of top runners. Kick-off.by (Peter A. Karnaugh). 
 Lars Kubusch and Hans Schöggl. Belarus - Championships before Independence. RSSSF.
 Football championship of the BSSR (Чемпионат БССР). Footballfacts.ru. 

 
Belarus
Soviet
1922 establishments in Belarus
1991 disestablishments in Belarus
Recurring sporting events established in 1922
Recurring events disestablished in 1991
Sport in the Byelorussian Soviet Socialist Republic
Belarus
Belarus